I Want a Dog is a 2003 animated short film, based on 1987 children's book of the same title by Dayal Kaur Khalsa. it is directed by Sheldon Cohen, is produced by Marcy Page and David Verrall. It was starring Marnie McPhail.It tells the story of a girl named May who wants more than anything to have a dog. She tries various strategies to get her parents to allow her one, at last settles for having a rollerskate which she treats like a dog, and in the end wins her desire.

The film has garnered 10 international awards, including First Prize from the Chicago International Children's Film Festival.
and the Zagreb World Festival of Animated Films.

See also
 Animation Based On Literature  
 Children's Stories  
 Children's Literature 
 Pets

References

Summary
May is a little girl who loves puppies. Her wish is to raise her puppy. However, her parents did not allow her to have a dog. May have tried numerous ways, but her parents still do not agree. When she thinks about to give up, she remembers what her dad had said when she was learning to skate in her childhood:" If at first you don't succeed, try again." Then she found a way to persuade her parents to agree her to have a dog. Finally, May successfully convince her parents to get her puppy.

External links
 Watch I Want a Dog at NFB.ca
 
 FactMonster page

2003 short films
Canadian animated short films
Canadian children's animated films
Animated films based on children's books
National Film Board of Canada animated short films
Films directed by Sheldon Cohen
2000s animated short films
2003 animated films
2003 films
Animated films about dogs
2000s English-language films
2000s Canadian films